Ratković may refer to:

 Ratković, Serbia, a village near Rekovac
 Ratković, a South Slavic surname derived from a masculine given name Ratko
 Andrija Ratković, Serbian footballer
 George Ratkovicz, American basketball player
 Milorad Ratković, Bosnian Serb football player
 Stefan Ratković, Serbian medieval nobleman
 Zoran Ratković, Croatian football player

See also
 Ratkovići (plural)

Croatian surnames
Serbian surnames